In the United States, the term high school rank may refer to two different meanings:

 The graded ranking of a student in comparison with his or her peers.
 The graded ranking of a school district in comparison with its peers, at a regional, statewide, or nationwide scale.

Student rank 
A student's rank is measured on a curve that is variable with the performance of their peers. It can be an unfair ability assessment if there are a number of high performers in a single grade; in such an instance, those students who are just merely "good" may end up being ranked low on the scale.

Colleges may use a student's high school rank as part of their admissions assessment process, to determine who may attend the college and who is not worthy of being educated there if space is limited.

High schools in the United States